Teruko Yamada (born 6 June 1956) is a Japanese luger. She competed in the women's singles event at the 1976 Winter Olympics.

References

External links
 

1956 births
Living people
Japanese female lugers
Olympic lugers of Japan
Lugers at the 1976 Winter Olympics
Sportspeople from Aomori Prefecture